Local elections took place in Muntinlupa on May 9, 2022 within the 2022 Philippine general election. Voters will elect the elective local posts in the city: the mayor, vice mayor, the congressman, and the 16 councilors, eight each in the two local legislative districts of Muntinlupa.

Background
Incumbent mayor Jaime Fresnedi is term-limited. Despite being eligible for a third and final consecutive term, incumbent representative Ruffy Biazon chose to run for mayor, thus switching places with Fresnedi, who will run in his place for a seat in Congress, with incumbent vice mayor Artemio Simundac as Biazon's running mate. They are running under the ticket of One Muntinlupa, a local party, with Fresnedi running under the Liberal Party.
 
Former Bureau of Immigration commissioner and 2019 mayoralty candidate Marc Red Mariñas and Eulogio Dioko II, son of former vice mayor Celso Dioko, will also run for mayoralty and vice mayoralty posts under the People's Reform Party.

Result

Mayor

Vice Mayor

District Representative

Councilor

By ticket

One Muntinlupa

Notes

Team Red Mariñas

Summary

1st District

2nd District

Opinion polling

References

2022 Philippine local elections
Elections in Muntinlupa
May 2022 events in the Philippines
2022 elections in Metro Manila